Jackson Township, Arkansas may refer to:

 Jackson Township, Boone County, Arkansas
 Jackson Township, Crittenden County, Arkansas
 Jackson Township, Dallas County, Arkansas
 Jackson Township, Little River County, Arkansas
 Jackson Township, Monroe County, Arkansas
 Jackson Township, Nevada County, Arkansas
 Jackson Township, Newton County, Arkansas
 Jackson Township, Pope County, Arkansas
 Jackson Township, Randolph County, Arkansas
 Jackson Township, Sharp County, Arkansas
 Jackson Township, Union County, Arkansas
 Jackson Township, White County, Arkansas

Former townships:
 Jackson Township, Calhoun County, Arkansas
 Jackson Township, Cleveland County, Arkansas

See also 
 Jackson Township (disambiguation)
 List of Arkansas townships

Arkansas township disambiguation pages